George Joseph Penny (October 24, 1897 – December 4, 1949) was one of Newfoundland's first three members of the Senate of Canada who were appointed on August 17, 1949, shortly after the province joined Canadian confederation.

He was the operator of a frozen fish plant business in the southwest of Newfoundland and had been an active member of the Newfoundland Confederate Association which had campaigned for the former colony to join Canada. Penny sat in the upper house as a Liberal. He died at the age of 51 after a bout of bronchial pneumonia.

References

External links
 

1897 births
1949 deaths
Canadian senators from Newfoundland and Labrador
Liberal Party of Canada senators
Dominion of Newfoundland people